The Clan may make reference to:

 A clan
 The Clan (composers), group of Motown composers
 The Clan – Tale of the Frogs, 1984 Finnish film
 The Clan (1920 film), a German silent film
 The Clan (2005 film), an Italian film
 The Clan (2015 film), an Argentine film
 Ku Klux Klan

See also
 Clan (disambiguation)